The Lavra of David or David Gareja Lavra is a historical and architectural monument within the monastic complex of David Gareja. It was built during the first half of the 6th century under the guidance of San David Gareja.

Architecture 
The monastery includes several buildings dating from the VI-XVIII centuries, intended for the use of churches, monks and visitors. It is surrounded by defensive walls with rounded towers.

In the center, there is an old church with a bell tower over the entrance.

It is located in a mountainous area rich in caves. In the monastery, a system has been created to collect, filter and use rainwater from the mountain. Water drips and accumulates continuously in one of the caves that enter the complex. According to legend, this cave is called "The Tear of David."

The largest and most important building in the complex is the Church of the Apostle John. Located in the heart of the complex, this church was built in the 12th century with red tiles.

The north wall of the church, restored during the 18th century, is decorated with wall paintings depicting different eras of David Gareja's life.

Leaders of the monastery 

 6th century - David Gareja 
 1881 - Archimandrite Grigory Dadiani

References

Literature 

 Sagaradze Sh., Georgian Soviet Encyclopedia, Vol. 3, p. 340, Tb., 1978.
 Lubinashvili N., Пещерные монастыри David-Гарежи, Тб., 1948. (Russian)

Georgian Orthodox monasteries